Stade de Reims won Division 1 season 1957/1958 of the French Association Football League with 48 points.

Participating teams

 Olympique Alès
 Angers SCO
 AS Béziers
 RC Lens
 Lille OSC
 Olympique Lyonnais
 Olympique de Marseille
 FC Metz
 AS Monaco
 OGC Nice
 Nîmes Olympique
 RC Paris
 Stade de Reims
 AS Saint-Etienne
 UA Sedan-Torcy
 FC Sochaux-Montbéliard
 Toulouse FC
 US Valenciennes-Anzin

Final table

Promoted from Division 2, who will play in Division 1 season 1958/1959
 FC Nancy: Champion of Division 2
 Stade Rennais UC: runner-up
 Limoges FC: Third place
 RC Strasbourg: Fourth place

Results

Top goalscorers

References
 Division 1 season 1957-1958 at pari-et-gagne.com

Ligue 1 seasons
French
1